City People Entertainment Awards are an annual accolade presented by City People Magazine to honour Nigerian and Ghanaian entertainers. The first edition was held in Abeokuta, Ogun State on June 14, 2009. The event was hosted by Governor Gbenga Daniel in the State House. The most recent ceremony was held on June 22, 2014 at 10 Degrees Event Centre, Lagos State.

2017 division 
In 2017, the award was divided into "City People Music Awards" and "City People Movie Awards". These awards should not be confused with the "City People Awards For Excellence" which is a separate awards ceremony by the same organizer, which honors achievers beyond just the boundaries of the entertainment space with categories such as "Lifetime Achievement Award", "Businessman of the Year", "Male Achiever of the Year" amongst other prestigious categories.

Categories

The following are the present categories:

Nigeria

Music
Music Marketer Of The Year 
Musician Of The Year (Male) 
Musician Of The Year (Female)
R&B Artiste of the Year 
Record Label of the Year
Rap Artiste of the Year 
Best Music Producer of the Year
Best Music Video Director of the Year
Dancehall/Reggae Act of the Year 
Most Popular Song of the Year
Best New Musician of the Year
Best Collabo of the Year 
Rap Album of the Year
Video of the Year 
Music Website of the Year
Nite Club of the Year
Hip Hop Song of the Year
Best Juju Artiste In The Diaspora
Islamic Artiste of the Year
Best Music Band of the Year
South South Musician of the Year
Radio/TV FM/Radio Station With Best Showbiz Content
Radio Station With Best Indigenous Showbiz Content
Music Channel of the Year
Best Supporting DJ in Diaspora

The Year (English)
Comic Actor Of The Year (English)
Most Promising Act of the Year
Best Actor Of The Year (Yoruba)
Best Actress Of The Year (Yoruba)
Best New Actor Of The Year (Yoruba)
Best New Actress Of The Year (Yoruba)
Best Supporting Actor of the Year (Yoruba)
Best Supporting Actress Of The Year (Yoruba)
Best Movie Of The Year (Yoruba)
Best Movie Producer Of The Year (Yoruba)
Best Movie Marketer of the Year (Yoruba)
Movie Director Of The Year (Yoruba) 
Most Promising Actress of the Year (Yoruba)
Most Promising Actor of the Year (Yoruba)
Comic Actor Of The Year (Yoruba)

Kannywood
Best Actor Of The Year
Best Actress of the Year 
Best Supporting Actor of The Year
Best Supporting Actress of The Year 
Best New Actor of The Year
Best New Actress of The Year
Best Director of The Year
Best Producer of The Year
Best Musician Of The Year 
Best Film Of The Year

Ghana

Movies
Best Actor Of The Year (Ghana)
Best Actress Of The Year (Ghana)
Best Supporting Actor Of The Year (Ghana)
Best Supporting Actress Of The Year (Ghana)
Entertainment Company of the Year
Best New Actress Of The Year (Ghana)
Best Showbiz-friendly Company Of The Year (Ghana)
Face Of Ghana Movies Award
Best Movie Of The Year (Ghana)
Hottest Ghanaian Actress In Nollywood
Most Promising Actress of the Year

Music
Musician of the Year (Male) 
Musician Of The Year (Female)
TV Station With Best Showbiz Content (Ghana)
Radio Station With Best Showbiz Content (Ghana)
Showbiz Blogger/Online Writer Of The Year (Ghana)
TV Hostess of the Year (Ghana)

References

Ghanaian music awards
Ghanaian film awards
Nigerian music awards
Nigerian film awards